Sara Sorribes Tormo (born 8 October 1996) is a Spanish professional tennis player. Sorribes Tormo has won one singles title and three doubles titles on the WTA Tour, as well as one doubles title on the WTA Challenger Tour. On the ITF Circuit, she has won ten singles and five doubles titles. She won her maiden WTA title at the 2021 Abierto Zapopan in Guadalajara. She achieved her career-high singles ranking of world No. 32 on 7 February 2022 and peaked at No. 40 in the WTA doubles rankings on 3 February 2020. On the Challenger Tour, she has been runner-up at the Bol Open, and champion at the Open de Limoges, in doubles in 2019.

Sorribes Tormo made her WTA Tour main-draw debut at the 2015 Rio Open, after making it through the qualifying rounds. Her first appearance at a Grand Slam tournament came at 2015 French Open, but she failed to qualify for the main draw, while her Grand Slam main-draw debut happened at the 2016 French Open, when she passed qualification.
Her most significant results in 2017 was reaching the semifinals of the WTA events at the 2017 Copa Colsanitas in Bogotá, Colombia in April and at the 2017 Ladies Championship Gstaad, Switzerland in July.
Her first Grand-Slam win came at the 2018 Wimbledon Championships, where she defeated Kaia Kanepi in the first round.

Sara had a career-high junior ranking of No. 33, and won three singles and three doubles titles on the ITF Junior Circuit. She was also runner-up at 2013 US Open in doubles, where together with Belinda Bencic, they lost to the Czech duo Barbora Krejčíková & Kateřina Siniaková. In 2014, she won the European Junior Championships, defeating her countrymate Paula Badosa in the final.

Until 2017, Sara used to play at ITF tournaments. During 2017, she entered the top 100 for the first time, and became more constant on the WTA Tour.

Playing for Spain Fed Cup team, she made her debut in the 2015 Fed Cup World Group II Play-offs, and has accumulated a win–loss record of 6–4.

Early life and background
Sara Sorribes Tormo was born on 8 October 1996 in Castellón de la Plana in Spain. Her mother owns a souvenir shop and also used to be a tennis instructor, while her father works in real estate and used to play pro soccer. Sara also has one brother, Pablo. Her mother introduced her to the sport at age 6. Sara's favorite shot is the volley, while her favorite surface is clay. Her favorite tournament is French Open. Growing up, she enjoyed watching Justine Henin, and now she also admires Sara Errani and David Ferrer. In her free time, she likes to hang out with her brother and her friends. Sara's current residence is in La Vall d'Uixó, Spain.

Professional summary

2012–15: Attempted to debut on WTA Tour, top 200

Sorribes Tormo played in her first main draw on the WTA Tour at the 2012 Barcelona Open, where she lost in first round of qualifying to Ani Mijačika. At the 2012 Madrid Open, she received a wildcard for the qualifying, but lost in the first round to Varvara Lepchenko.

Next year, she received another wildcard chance for qualifying at Madrid, but lost in the second round to Alexandra Dulgheru. At the Palermo International and Swedish Open, she once failed to qualify for the main draw.

In 2014, she again received a wildcard for the qualifying of the Madrid Open, but lost to Caroline Garcia in the first round. During the year, she got only one chance to debut in a WTA Tour main draw, but lost in the first round of qualifying at the Luxembourg Open to Barbora Krejčíková.

In 2015, Sara was successful on her first attempt to play in a WTA Tour main draw, passing qualifying at the Rio Open, where she lost in the first round to Paula Ormaechea. On 23 March 2015, Sara entered top 200 for the first time, getting to a rank of 198. At the Family Circle Cup, she went even further, reaching third round, defeating Anastasia Pavlyuchenkova and Shelby Rogers, but then lost to Sara Errani. At the Madrid Open, once again as a wildcard, she lost in the first round of qualifying to Bojana Jovanovski. Then she played at French Open, which was her first appearance at any Grand Slam qualifying. There, Sara didn't make it to the main draw, losing to Shahar Pe'er in the first round. At Wimbledon, she lost in second round ofqualifying  to Yang Zhaoxuan.

2016–17: Breakthrough in singles, Grand Slam debut, top 100

Sara didn't start the 2016 season well in qualifyings at the Brisbane International, Hobart International and Australian Open, respectively. At Melbourne, she first defeated Cindy Burger, but then lost to Zhu Lin.  At Morocco Open, she passed qualifying, and in the main-draw defeated Ons Jabeur, but wasn't good enough for Kiki Bertens in the second round. Once again, with a wildcard for the Madrid Open, this time for the main draw, Sara lost to Samantha Stosur. It also was her first appearance in main-draw of any Premier 5/Premier Mandatory tournament. At French Open, she won three matches and then qualified for the first time to a Grand Slam main draw. In her debut match she won only two games against Anastasia Pavlyuchenkova. The Mallorca Open was hrt first main-draw WTA Tour grass tournament, where she also had her first win, winning against compatriot Paula Badosa. In the second round, she lost to Ana Ivanovic. At Wimbledon, she was stopped by Irina Khromacheva in the first round of qualifying. At the US Open, Sara was close to her main-draw debut, but lost to Kristína Kučová in the third round of qualifying. At Korea Open, Sara made her first WTA Tour quarterfinal, where Patricia Maria Țig defeated her. Sara finished the year as world No. 107, being only one place behind her then-best ranking of 106, that she reached on 14 November 2016.

Sara started 2017 with two losses in qualifying, at Shenzhen Open and Hobart International, but then she got into the main draw at Australian Open. At Australian Open, she faced No. 5 seed Karolína Plíšková, but won only two games. At Hungarian Open, she lost in the first round to Hsieh Su-wei, while at Malaysian Open, she got to the second round, where she lost to Duan Yingying in three-sets. For the first time, Sara entered Indian Wells Open in qualifying, where she succeed in getting to the main draw. In the first round, she defeated Ekaterina Makarova, her first win at any Premier 5/Premier Mandatory tournament, but in the second round, she wasn't good enough for No. 6 seed Agnieszka Radwańska. After this result, on 20 March 2017 Sara debuted in the top 100, reaching a rank of 99. At the Miami Open, she also entered tournament in qualifying, but this time she wasn't successful, losing to Madison Brengle in final stage of qualification. At Monterrey Open, she got to the second round, where she lost to countrymate Carla Suárez Navarro. Then, Sara finally got more recognizable result, reaching her first WTA semifinal at Copa Colsanitas, where countrymate Lara Arruabarrena stopped her from reaching her first WTA final. On 8 May 2017, Sara got to her then-best career ranking of 79, which was also her best ranking until 2019. At the Madrid Open, Sara lost in the first round to Samantha Stosur for the second year in a row. At Italian Open, she failed in qualifying, losing to CiCi Bellis. At the French Open, Sara lost to Timea Bacsinszky in straight sets. In the grass season, Sara didn't do well, losing in the first round of Mallorca Open to Anastasia Pavlyuchenkova, as well as the first round of Wimbledon to Naomi Osaka. In the second part of the clay-court season, Sara made her second career WTA semifinal at the Swiss Open. During her semifinal match against Kiki Bertens, after finishing the first set, Sara was forced to retire due to left wrist injury. At the Cincinnati Open, she lost in first round of qualifying to Monica Puig. Losing to Kurumi Nara in first round of US Open, Sara completed participation at all four Grand Slam events. By the end of 2017 season, Sara reached the quarterfinals at Korea Open and Tianjin Open. She failed in qualifying for the China Open, losing to Andrea Petkovic in the final stage.

Sara finished the year ranked No. 99.

2018–20: First Grand Slam and top-10 wins

In 2018, first tournament for Sara was Qatar Open, where she lost in final stage of qualifying to Kateryna Bondarenko. Next week, she played at Hungarian Open, where in first round Ysaline Bonaventure defeated her. At Indian Wells qualifying, she won against Allie Kiick and Ajla Tomljanović, and reserved her spot in the main draw, but lost to CiCi Bellis. At Miami, she lost in the first round of qualifying to Carol Zhao. Her first WTA Tour main-draw win in 2018 happened at the Monterrey Open, where she defeated Tereza Martincová, but lost in the second round to Ana Bogdan. Next week, she got to second round of Copa Colsanitas, where Lara Arruabarrena stopped her. At the Morocco Open, Aleksandra Krunić was better in second round. At Madrid, Sara earned her first win there against Madison Keys, but then lost to Kristýna Plíšková in the second round. At the French Open, she lost in second round of qualifying. At Wimbledon, Sara made her first singles grand-slam win, defeating Kaia Kanepi in first round, but lost to Suárez Navarro in the second round. At the Swiss Open in Gstaad, Sara lost to Mandy Minella, losing her chance to get to her first semifinal in 2018. At US Open, Sara lost to Daria Gavrilova in the first round of the main draw. At Wuhan Open, she passed qualifying and lost in the first round to Viktorija Golubic. Her appearance at Wuhan was her first Premier 5 tournament. For the second year in a row, she lost to Andrea Petkovic in qualification of the China Open.

Sara started the 2019 season playing in quarterfinal at ASB Classic, where on her way to the semifinal, Hsieh Su-wei stopped her. At Australian Open, she lost in first round to Anett Kontaveit. At Indian Wells Open, she lost in the second round of qualification, while in Miami she got to the second round in main draw, where she lost to Donna Vekić. In Charleston, she was eliminated in the second round by Sloane Stephens in two tie-breaks. In Bogotá, she was better than Christina McHale and Ana Bogdan in first two rounds, but then lost in the quarterfinal to Beatriz Haddad Maia. At Stuttgart Open, she won three matches in qualification and then lost in the first round in the main draw to Andrea Petkovic. At Madrid Open, she was better than her countrymate Lara Arruabarrena in the first round, but her next opponent, Naomi Osaka, was better in the second. At Italian Open, she failed in qualification, losing in the first round to Ons Jabeur. At Morocco Open, she also did not do well, losing in the second round to Nina Stojanović. At French Open she marked her first win there, winning against Alison Van Uytvanck, but in next round, Sloane Stephens defeated her. 

On 10 June 2019, she reached her career-high ranking of world No. 64. In the grass-court season, she got to the second round of Nottingham Open, and the first round of Mallorca Open. At Wimbledon, she was forced to retire during her first-round match against former world No. 1, Caroline Wozniacki, while trailing 5–4. At the US Open, just like at Australian Open, she lost to Anett Kontaveit. During Asian tour, Sara played only two WTA tournaments. She played at the Japan Women's Open, where she reached quarterfinals, losing to Misaki Doi in straight sets, and then she headed to Guangzhou, where she was stopped in the first round by Anna Blinkova.

The first two tournaments in 2020 were not successful for Sara, losing in both of them in the first round. Then she got to the Australian Open, where she defeated Veronika Kudermetova, but just like the year before, Anett Kontaveit stopped her from going to the next round. In February, in Fed Cup Qualifying Round, playing for Spain, Sara defeated Naomi Osaka 6–0, 6–3. That was her first and so far only top-10 win. At both Mexican tournaments, Mexican Open and Monterrey Open, Sara lost in the first round. After the comeback of the WTA Tour after COVID-19 pandemic outbreak, Sara played at the Palermo International, but lost to Dayana Yastremska in straight sets. In Prague, she reached the quarterfinals, winning against Barbora Strýcová and Laura Siegemund, but then lost to Irina-Camelia Begu in three-sets. At the US Open, she beat Claire Liu in the first round before 16th seed Elise Mertens knocked her out of the tournament. In Istanbul, she defeated Heather Watson but then lost to Paula Badosa in the second round. At the French Open, she faced top seed Simona Halep and lost, winning only four games, all of them in the first set.

2021: First WTA singles title, top 50 debut
Sara started the year with a quarterfinal appearance at the Abu Dhabi Open, where she lost to Marta Kostyuk, in three sets. She then had a few first-round exits, losing in the first round of the Australian Open to Daria Saville, in straight sets. In early March, Sorribes Tormo won her first WTA singles title at the Abierto Zapopan. She only lost one set on the way to her win, beating second seed Marie Bouzková, and then former world No. 5, Eugenie Bouchard, in straight sets. After that, she headed to the Monterrey Open where she made it to the semifinals losing to the eventual champion, Leylah Fernandez. Sara had main-draw access to the Miami Open where she reached the quarterfinals losing to world No. 9, Bianca Andreescu, in three sets. This was Sara's first WTA 1000 event. On the road to the quarterfinals, she beat Australian Open runner-up Jennifer Brady, 21st seed Elena Rybakina and 27th seed Ons Jabeur. As a result, she entered the top 50 at world No. 48 on 5 April 2021.

In the first round of Wimbledon, Sorribes Tormo weathered 47 winners to beat Ana Konjuh 6–3, 3–6, 6–3, then squared off against 2018 champion Angelique Kerber in a 3-hour, 19 minute epic Kerber pulled out, 7–5, 5–7, 6–4, despite being broken seven times. The players received a standing ovation from the spectators for their efforts.

At the 2020 Tokyo Olympics, Sorribes Tormo shocked world No. 1, Ashleigh Barty, in straight sets, 6–4. 6–3. In the second round, she defeated Fiona Ferro (6-1, 6–4), but lost in the round of 16 to Anastasia Pavlyuchenkova (1-6, 3–6).

Tormo beat 22nd seed Karolína Muchová, 6–2, 7–6, to reach the second round of the US Open, only to be swept aside by Emma Raducanu in the third, 6–0, 6–1.

2022: Career high ranking in top 35

Performance timelines

Only main-draw results in WTA Tour, Grand Slam tournaments, Fed Cup/Billie Jean King Cup and Olympic Games are included in win–loss records.

Singles
Current through the 2022 Emilia Romagna Open.

Doubles
Current through the 2022 US Open.

WTA career finals

Singles: 1 (1 title)

Doubles: 4 (3 titles, 1 runner-up)

WTA 125 tournament finals

Singles: 1 (1 runner-up)

Doubles: 1 (1 title)

ITF Circuit finals

Singles: 19 (10 titles, 9 runner–ups)

Doubles: 7 (5 titles, 2 runner–ups)

Junior Grand Slam finals

Girls' doubles: 1 (1 runner–up)

WTA Tour career earnings

Career Grand Slam statistics

Seedings 
The tournaments won by Sorribes Tormo are in boldface, and advanced into finals by Sorribes Tormo are in italics.

Best Grand Slam results details

Record against other players

Record against top 10 players
Sorribes Tormo's record against players who have been ranked in the top 10. Active players are in boldface.

No. 1 wins

Top 10 wins

Notes

References

External links

 
 
 

1996 births
Living people
People from La Vall d'Uixó
Sportspeople from the Province of Castellón
Spanish female tennis players
Tennis players from the Valencian Community
Mediterranean Games silver medalists for Spain
Mediterranean Games medalists in tennis
Competitors at the 2013 Mediterranean Games
Olympic tennis players of Spain
Tennis players at the 2020 Summer Olympics